Saajan Ka Ghar is a 1994 Indian Bollywood film directed by Surendra Kumar Bohra. It stars Juhi Chawla and Rishi Kapoor in pivotal roles. The whole film revolves around Juhi's character. Juhi has once again proved her acting talent in the film. The song Sawan Aayea Badal Chaaye and Babul De Do Duaa were the most popular songs of the movie. The movie is a remake of 1988 Rajasthani movie Bai Chali Sasariye. The film was declared a semi-hit at the box office.

Plot
Dhanraj (Anupam Kher) is a poor but greedy man whose wife dies giving birth to their daughter Laxmi (Juhi Chawla). Dhanraj hates his daughter as he blames her for his wife's death. Just as Laxmi is born, Dhanraj wins a huge lottery and becomes extremely rich. Laxmi is raised by her aunt as Dhanraj refuses to so much as look at her. He remarries and has a son Suraj (Deepak Tijori). Although Laxmi is treated very poorly by her father and step mother, she is very close to her half-brother Suraj. Her father and step mother believe that Laxmi brings bad luck. Suraj disagrees and tries to save his sister from their cruelty as much as he can. In spite of his mother's orders to stay away from Laxmi, he goes to his sister to get a rakhi on the day of Raksha Bandhan. He later meets with an accident and one of his arms is amputated. His mother blames Laxmi and beats the living daylights out of her. Laxmi's father and step mother arrange her marriage with Amar (Rishi Kapoor), an army officer. Dhanraj dies in an accident soon after Laxmi's wedding. His wife and son lose their property and are forced to move out of their bungalow. In the meantime, Laxmi, who literally cannot get a break has a miscarriage. The doctor tells Amar that Laxmi will die if she gets pregnant again and carries that pregnancy to term. Amar decides not to tell anyone about this, including Laxmi, so as to spare her the grief. However, Amar's mother starts plotting her murder when Laxmi doesn't conceive even after recovering from the miscarriage. She decides that Laxmi probably cannot have children anymore and chooses the most obvious course of action: murder. But before she can carry out her plan, Laxmi overhears Amar talking about the miscarriage and its affect. She decides to have a child even if it kills her. She taunts Amar and the latter is so provoked that he forgets that his wife will die if she gets pregnant. He spends the night with her. Later, he is horrified at what he has done. However, instead of consulting a doctor or convincing her to get an abortion he goes off to duty. While he is away, Amar's mother throws Laxmi out of the house. Laxmi starts working around in the village and sleeps in a barn. She gives birth to a baby boy by herself and takes him to her mother-in-law. Amar comes home just in time to see Laxmi breathe her last. The film ends with Laxmi's family gathering around her pyre wishing they had treated her better.

Cast
 Juhi Chawla... Laxmi Khanna
 Rishi Kapoor... Amar Khanna
 Deepak Tijori... Suraj Dhanraj
 Farheen... Kiran
 Anupam Kher... Mr. Dhanraj
 Kader Khan... Uncle
 Mohnish Bahl ... Vicky 
 Bindu... Mrs. Dhanraj
 Shubha Khote... Mrs. Kamla Khanna
 Alok Nath... Mr. Ram Khanna aka 'Ramji'
 Johnny Lever... Dilip K. Bose / Champa Bose
 Anjana Mumtaz... Gita Dhanraj
 Beena Banerjee... Shanti Dhanraj
 Tej Sapru... Teja

Soundtrack 

Nadeem Shravan composed the music.

References

External links

1990s Hindi-language films
1994 films
Films scored by Nadeem–Shravan
Indian drama films
Hindi remakes of Rajasthani films
1994 drama films
Hindi-language drama films